Getting There is a 1988 studio album by jazz guitarist John Abercrombie with bassist Marc Johnson and drummer Peter Erskine. Tenor saxophonist Michael Brecker plays on three tracks.

Reception 
Critic Jim Todd at Allmusic gave the album 2½ stars, stating, "The music on this 1988 release from guitarist John Abercrombie is groomed to such aseptic perfection that little remains of the musical personalities behind these sounds... Musicians of the caliber of Abercrombie, Johnson, Erskine, and Brecker cannot fail to generate interest when they get together. This time out, though, their efforts would have been better presented as a master class workshop". The Penguin Guide to Jazz gave the album 3 stars.  

Tyran Grillo of Between Sound and Space commented "Getting There seems, like many of ECM’s dates from the decade, to have been overlooked by many, but its rewards are plentiful... This album is also marked by thoughtful choices in distortion and amplification, as exemplified in the title track, in which Abercrombie lets fly his laser-honed melodies, burning like a welding torch in a silent film... Abercrombie has a tendency to catapult his notes, sending listeners on clean, high lobs. These are some of his brightest, not least because of Lee Townsend’s sparkling production. And in the company of such comparably strong wings, this flock can do no wrong. This is captivating music-making that welcomes us into the joy of musicians at the peak of their expressive powers".

Track listing

Personnel
 John Abercrombie – acoustic and electric guitars, guitar synthesizer
 Michael Brecker – tenor saxophone
 Marc Johnson – double bass
 Peter Erskine – drums

References

John Abercrombie (guitarist) albums
1987 albums